Thomas Wren (January 2, 1824 – February 5, 1904) was a United States representative from Nevada. He belonged to the Republican Party and represented the Nevada At-Large Congressional District in the 45th Congress, from 1877 to 1879. He served in the Nevada Assembly.

References

1824 births
1904 deaths
Republican Party members of the Nevada Assembly
Republican Party members of the United States House of Representatives from Nevada
People from McArthur, Ohio
19th-century American politicians